Justice Raju Varadarajulu Raveendran or simply R. V. Raveendran (born 15 October 1946) is a former judge of the Supreme Court of India. On 13 October 2011, the Supreme Court bench headed by Justice R Raveendran, inexplicably, nearly halved the sum of compensation awarded to victims by the [Delhi high court], and slashed punitive damages to be paid by cinema owners, the Ansal brothers, from ₹2.5 crore (equivalent to ₹4.4 crore or US$550,000 in 2020) to ₹25 lakh (equivalent to ₹44 lakh or US$55,000 in 2020).. He retired the next day, 14 October 2011, upon reaching superannuation. On 27 October 2021, Supreme Court of India appointed Justice RV Raveendran to supervise a three-member committee that will examine the allegations of unauthorised surveillance using Israeli spyware Pegasus.

Career
He holds a bachelor's degree in Science and Law. He became an advocate in 1968. He was inducted to the Karnataka High Court in 1993. He became the Chief Justice of the Madhya Pradesh High Court in 2004, and was elevated to the Supreme Court of India in October 2005.

He has seen several high-profile cases like the OBC reservation, 1993 Bombay bombings and the Krishna Godavari basin dispute. He also recused from the Krishna Godavari basin dispute case citing conflict of interest.

References

1946 births
Living people
University Law College, Bangalore University alumni
20th-century Indian judges
Chief Justices of the Madhya Pradesh High Court
Judges of the Karnataka High Court
Justices of the Supreme Court of India